Dalang may refer to:
 Dalang (puppeteer), a puppet master in Indonesia
 Dalang, Sudan, a town in South Kordofan State in Sudan

Places in China
 Dalang, Dongguan, a town in Dongguan, Guangdong
 Dalang Subdistrict (大浪街道), a subdistrict in Longhua District, Shenzhen, Guangdong
 Dalang Township (达浪乡), a township in Hezheng County, Gansu